Gulshan Aliyeva-Kengerli or Gulshan Aliyeva-Kangarli (born in 1970) is Ph.D. in philology, professor, Fuzuli scholar, Prorector of the Azerbaijan State University of Culture and Arts. She was awarded the Taraggi Medal in 2013.

Biography 
Gulshan Teymur gizi Aliyeva-Kengerli was born in 1970 in Nakhchivan.

Education 
In 1986, she finished Baku City Secondary School No. 6.

In 1993, she graduated from Azerbaijan State Institute of Art.

In 2000 she successfully defended candidate's thesis on “Traditions of Fuzuli in the modern poetry of Azerbaijan”, in 2009 she defended Ph.D. thesis on “Development stages of Fuzuli studies in Azerbaijan”.

Professional experience 
During 1998–2000, she was employed as an academic researcher at the Museum of History under Azerbaijan National Academy of Sciences and at the National Museum of Azerbaijani Literature named after Nizami Ganjavi.

In 2005-2012 she headed the Department of “Azerbaijani language and literature” of the Azerbaijan State University of Culture and Arts.

In 2012 she was appointed as the Prorector on Educational work.

Since 2015 she has been employed as the Prorector on International relations and educational work.

Social activities 
In 2005 she became a member of the New Azerbaijan Party.

In 2002–2014, he headed the Department of Promotion of Heydar Aliyev's heritage of the Central Scientific Library of the Azerbaijan National Academy of Sciences.

In 2005 she became a member of the Union of Azerbaijani Writers as a literary critic and theorist of literature.

In 2003, she received the national "Memory" award for the book "The Magic of Fuzuli" and was also awarded for “Research and promotion of Heydar Aliyev's heritage”. In 2013 she was awarded with the Taraggi Medal. In 2014 she received Jafar Jabbarli award for contributions to the field of literary studies.

Scientific activities 
She presented papers at scientific conferences and symposia in Iran, Turkey, Central Asian states, Russia, Spain, France, and Italy.
She is the author of numerous books and monographs, including "Contemporary Poetry and Classical Heritage" (2000), "Issues of Poetics" (2002), "The Magic of Fuzuli" (2003), "Fuzuli Studies in Azerbaijan" (2007), "The Phenomenon of Fuzuli in Literary Studies" (2009), "Aruz Canons in the study of Fuzuli Heritage", "Fuzuli studies: history and theory" (2008), "Artistic thought: historical reality and aesthetic icon" (2011), "Lectures on Azerbaijani literature" (textbook 2014), "Fuzuli poetry" (2015), "Sufism" (2016), “Husnu-camal, agli kamal” (selected examples of Nasimi's poetry) (2019), "Unity of imagination and cognition (philosophical trend in Azerbaijani poetry)" (2021). She is also the author of various books published in Russia, Iran, Turkey, and Uzbekistan and over 200 scientific-theoretical articles.

Scientific contributions 
 Studied Fuzuli traditions in modern Azerbaijani poetry in the context of the problem of traditions and innovations ("Contemporary poetry and Classical heritage")
 Studied the oldest problem existing in literary studies - the problem of poetics ("Issues of Poetics" and "Fuzuli Poetics")
 Conducted conceptual-systematic study of all stages of 500-year development path of Fuzuli studies in Azerbaijan  ("Fuzuli Studies in Azerbaijan" monograph).
 Analyzed historicity and aesthetic idol relations, especially the pillars of Fuzuli's works - contentment, fondness and sorrow based on classical and modern poetry materials. 
 Analyzed main problems that existed in the Middle Ages Literature of Azerbaijan – artistic-philosophical movement called Sufism and Hurufism in terms of theoretical-intellectual issues.  ("Artistic thought: historical reality and aesthetic icon", "Sufism", “Husnu-camal, agli kamal” (selected examples of Nasimi's poetry)) 
 Awareness-raising and pedagogical work is one of the major areas of Gulshan Aliyeva's scientific contributions. She delivered lectures on such topics as “Aruz rhythmical patterns”, “The Magic of Fuzuli”, “Classical Azerbaijani Literature”.  
 Studied the problems of classical poetry and aesthetics and conducted the systematic-structural study of one of the two main tendencies of the 20th century - philosophical-intellectual poetry  ("Unity of imagination and cognition (philosophical trend in Azerbaijani poetry)")

References

External links
Works on WorldCat
Gulshan Aliyeva-Kengerli on Goolge Books

1970 births
Azerbaijani professors
Living people
Azerbaijan State University of Culture and Arts